Carlos Domingues Bendinha de Almeida (born 24 September 1976) is an Angolan professional basketball shooting guard and a member of the Angola national basketball team. Almeida played for Angola at the 2000 and the 2004 Summer Olympics, the 2002 and 2006 basketball world championship as well as the 2005, 2007 Africa championships and 2009 Africa championship.

In addition to playing basketball, he has been serving a second term as a member of the Angolan parliament, representing the ruling party, MPLA.

Carlos Almeida has won seven FIBA Africa Championship titles.

On 17 April 2014, Almeida played his last official game in the 1st leg of the 2014 Angola Basketball Cup against Petro de Luanda, a match involving the two most important clubs in his career. At the end of the game, honours were paid to him for his long, successful basketball career.

References

External links
 
 Carlos Almeida at basket-stats.info
 Carlos Almeida at AfricaBasket

1976 births
Living people
Basketball players from Luanda
Atlético Petróleos de Luanda basketball players
C.D. Primeiro de Agosto men's basketball players
Angolan men's basketball players
Basketball players at the 2000 Summer Olympics
Basketball players at the 2004 Summer Olympics
Basketball players at the 2008 Summer Olympics
Olympic basketball players of Angola
Shooting guards
2010 FIBA World Championship players
2006 FIBA World Championship players
2002 FIBA World Championship players
MPLA politicians
Members of the National Assembly (Angola)